Raleigh Leonidas Aitchison (December 5, 1887 – September 26, 1958), nicknamed "Redskin" was a pitcher in Major League Baseball from 1911 to 1915. He continued to pitch in the minor leagues through 1923 with an assortment of teams.

After his retirement from baseball he worked for 18 years for the Columbus, Kansas police department and was a deputy sheriff for Cherokee County, Kansas.

References

External links 

1887 births
1958 deaths
People from Tyndall, South Dakota
Major League Baseball pitchers
Baseball players from South Dakota
Brooklyn Dodgers players
Brooklyn Robins players
Leavenworth Orioles players
Vinita Cherokees players
Hutchinson Salt Packers players
Wichita Jobbers players
Nashville Vols players
Montgomery Rebels players
Newark Indians players
Chattanooga Lookouts players
Milwaukee Brewers (minor league) players
Beaumont Oilers players
San Antonio Bronchos players
Rochester Hustlers players
Moline Plowboys players
Oklahoma City Indians players
Evansville Evas players
High Point Furniture Makers players
Tulsa Oilers (baseball) players
People from Columbus, Kansas
Fort Scott Giants players